The Northern Territory Minister for Primary Industry and Resources is a Minister of the Crown in the Government of the Northern Territory. The minister administered their portfolio through the Department of Primary Industry and Resources.

The last minister was Paul Kirby (Labor). He was sworn in on 31 January 2019 following the expulsion of Ken Vowles from the Gunner Ministry.

In September 2020, the Department of Primary Industry and Resources was restructured into the Department of Industry, Tourism and Trade.

Responsibilities 
The responsibilities of this position included:

List of Ministers for Primary Industry and Resources

References

Northern Territory-related lists
Ministers of the Northern Territory government